The 1902 Philadelphia Phillies season was a season in American baseball. The team finished seventh in the National League with a record of 56–81, 46 games behind the Pittsburgh Pirates.

Offseason 
 October 19, 1901: Ed Delahanty jumped from the Phillies to the Washington Senators.

Preseason 
The Phillies held spring training in 1902 in Washington, North Carolina where the team practiced and played exhibition games at the city's race track inside the inclosure. The team journeyed from Philadelphia to Norfolk by boat on the steamer Yemassee, departing the Arch Street wharf on March 22, 1902. From Norfolk the team took the train to Washington. The Phillies made their headquarters at the Hotel Nicholson on Main Street. It was the only season the Phillies trained in Washington.

Regular season 
In 1902, the Phillies obtained an injunction, effective only in Pennsylvania, barring Nap Lajoie from playing baseball for any team other than the Phillies. The American League responded by transferring Lajoie's contract to the Cleveland Indians, then known as the Bronchos and subsequently renamed the "Naps" in Lajoie's honor for several seasons.

Season standings

Record vs. opponents

Roster

Player stats

Batting

Starters by position 
Note: Pos = Position; G = Games played; AB = At bats; H = Hits; Avg. = Batting average; HR = Home runs; RBI = Runs batted in

Other batters 
Note: G = Games played; AB = At bats; H = Hits; Avg. = Batting average; HR = Home runs; RBI = Runs batted in

Pitching

Starting pitchers 
Note: G = Games pitched; IP = Innings pitched; W = Wins; L = Losses; ERA = Earned run average; SO = Strikeouts

Other pitchers 
Note: G = Games pitched; IP = Innings pitched; W = Wins; L = Losses; ERA = Earned run average; SO = Strikeouts

Relief pitchers 
Note: G = Games pitched; W = Wins; L = Losses; SV = Saves; ERA = Earned run average; SO = Strikeouts

Notes

References 
1902 Philadelphia Phillies season at Baseball Reference

Philadelphia Phillies seasons
Philadelphia Phillies season
Philly